Island council elections were held in the Caribbean Netherlands on 20 March 2019 to elect the members of the island councils of Bonaire and Saba. The elections were held on the same day as the electoral college elections in the Caribbean Netherlands, and the provincial and water board elections in the European Netherlands. The election was won by the Bonaire People's Movement (4 seats) in Bonaire and by the Windward Islands People's Movement (5 seats) in Saba.

Campaign

Saba 
The Windward Islands People's Movement (WIPM) made "stability and continuation" their top campaign issues, citing financial leadership and good relationships with the Netherlands. They promised to continue fighting for economic development, a "realistic social minimum", and poverty alleviation by reducing of the cost of living and the cost of doing business on Saba, with commitments to push for more "affordable transportation, energy, and telecommunications", as well as increasing the island's autonomy to allow it to grant work permits. The party's first rally was held on 20 February.

The Saba Labour Party (SLP) submitted its party list on 4 February 2019.

On 2 February 2019, Dave Levenstone announced he would form a new political party to run for a seat on the island council after working for 40 years in government service. He frequently criticized what he saw as a lack of engagement with Sabans. His slogan was "a strong voice for Saba". He submitted a blank list with his name on it.

Participating parties

Bonaire

Saba

Results

Bonaire

Saba

See also
2020 Island Council of Sint Eustatius election

References

Dutch island
Island council
March 2019 events in North America
2019 in Bonaire
Elections in Bonaire
Elections in Saba (island)